Kalyta is an urban-type settlement in Brovary Raion (district) of Kyiv Oblast (province) in northern Ukraine. It hosts the administration of Kalyta settlement hromada, one of the hromadas of Ukraine. Kalyta's population was 4,982 as of the 2001 Ukrainian Census. Current population: .

History
The town of Kalyta is said to have been founded in 1600, although the first written mention of the town dates Kalyta to 1628, seen in an old Polish illustration. During the middle of the 17th century, the local organization of the Elected Cossacks were based in Kalyta.

Symbol
Kalyta was settled on a raised landscape, which allowed the town's inhabitants to build windmills which would produce grain for all of the nearby settlements. At the turn of the 20th century, townsfolk stated that there was a total of 62 windmills in Kalyta. The town's coat of arms, respectfully, features a windmill.

References

Brovary Raion
Urban-type settlements in Brovary Raion
Populated places established in 1600